Broomfield Township is a civil township of Isabella County in the U.S. state of Michigan.  As of the 2000 census, the township population was 1,620.

History
Broomfield Township was organized in 1866.  There was a village named Bundy in the township from about 1870 until 1897.  It was largely a lumbering village.

Communities 
 The village of Lake Isabella is at the northern boundary of the township, partially within Broomfield Township and partially in Sherman Township.
 Broomfield Center is an unincorporated community near the center of the township at

Geography

Demographics
As of the census of 2000, there were 1,620 people, 618 households, and 451 families residing in the township. There were 737 housing units at an average density of 21.1 per square mile (8.2/km2). The racial makeup of the township was 95.00% White, 1.42% African American, 1.17% Native American, 0.25% Asian, 0.06% Pacific Islander, 1.11% from other races, and 0.99% from two or more races. Hispanic or Latino of any race were 2.10% of the population.

There were 618 households, out of which 31.2% had children under the age of 18 living with them, 61.7% were married couples living together, 7.9% had a female householder with no husband present, and 26.9% were non-families. 19.7% of all households were made up of individuals, and 5.2% had someone living alone who was 65 years of age or older.  The average household size was 2.60 and the average family size was 2.98.

In the township the population was spread out, with 24.7% under the age of 18, 8.5% from 18 to 24, 27.1% from 25 to 44, 25.8% from 45 to 64, and 13.9% who were 65 years of age or older.  The median age was 38 years. For every 100 females, there were 95.4 males.  For every 100 females age 18 and over, there were 97.1 males.

The median income for a household in the township was $36,711, and the median income for a family was $40,234. Males had a median income of $31,523 versus $21,696 for females. The per capita income for the township was $17,227.  About 9.9% of families and 15.1% of the population were below the poverty line, including 20.6% of those under age 18 and 13.2% of those age 65 or over.

References

Notes

Sources

Townships in Isabella County, Michigan
1866 establishments in Michigan
Townships in Michigan